The Canadian Joint Incident Response Unit (CJIRU) of the Canadian Armed Forces was created "to provide timely and agile broad-based CBRN (chemical, biological, radiological and nuclear) support to the Government of Canada in order to prevent, control and mitigate CBRN threats to Canada, Canadians, and Canadian interests". It is a sub-unit of the Canadian Special Operations Forces Command (CANSOFCOM).

History
Subsequent to the terrorist attacks of September 11, 2001, and the Chief Review Services Report on Nuclear, Biological and Chemical Defence of the same year, it became evident that the  Canadian Forces needed to increase the breadth of its nuclear, biological and chemical defence (NBCD) capabilities. The federal government, under then–Prime Minister Jean Chrétien, allotted $30 million in the December 2001 budget to enhance this capability and create the Joint Nuclear, Biological and Chemical Defence Company (JNBCD Coy). In September 2007, JNBCD Coy was reorganized into CJIRU, a rapid deployment response team due to the company's vast operational capabilities, duties, and  responsibilities.

Due to the requirement for rapid deployment of the unit, CJIRU is based alongside airlift assets at 8 Wing Trenton, Ontario. The former-JNBCD Coy Headquarters were located at CFB Kingston, Ontario.

See also
Australian Special Operations Engineer Regiment

References

External links
 

Canadian Armed Forces
Canadian Special Operations Force Command